Continental Shelf Station Two or Conshelf Two was an attempt at creating an environment in which people could live and work on the sea floor. It was the successor to Continental Shelf Station One (Conshelf One). Precontinent has been used to describe the set of projects to build an underwater "village" carried out by Jacques-Yves Cousteau and his team. The projects were named Precontinent I, Precontinent II and Precontinent III. Each following project was aimed at increasing the depth at which people continuously lived under water.

Precontinent I
Precontinent I was constructed offshore from Marseille, France, in 1962. Two scuba divers spent two weeks in a small chamber 12 meters deep on the seabed.

Precontinent II

In 1963, six oceanauts lived 10 metres down in the Red Sea, at Sha’ab Rumi off Sudan, in a starfish-shaped house for 30 days.  The undersea living experiment also had two other structures, one a submarine hangar that housed a small, two man submarine referred to as the "diving saucer" for its resemblance to a science fiction flying saucer, and a smaller "deep cabin" where two oceanauts lived at a depth of 30 metres for a week.  The undersea colony was supported with air, water, food, power, and all other essentials of life, from a large support team above. Men on the bottom performed a number of experiments intended to determine the practicality of working on the sea floor and were subjected to continual medical examinations.

The work was funded in part by the French petrochemical industry, who, along with Jacques Cousteau, hoped that such manned colonies could serve as base stations for the future exploitation of the sea. Such colonies did not find a productive future, however, as Cousteau, after forming Conshelf Three a few years later, withdrew his support for such exploitation of the sea and put his efforts toward conservation.  It was also found in later years that industrial tasks underwater could be more efficiently performed by undersea robot devices and divers operating from the surface or from smaller lowered structures, made possible by a more advanced understanding of diving physiology and more complex mixtures of breathing gases.

Two support ships on the surface provided compressed air and other logistical support to Precontinent II.  When the experiment ended, two structures were dismantled and removed.  The rest became undersea destinations for recreational divers.

Conshelf Two is documented in Jacques Cousteau's 1964 documentary film World Without Sun.

See also

References

Bibliography

External links
 

Scientific diving
Underwater habitats
History of scuba diving